The 1999 Idaho Vandals football team represented the University of Idaho in the 1999 NCAA Division I-A football season.

Martin Stadium was used to satisfy NCAA attendance requirements for Division I-A  The  Kibbie Dome, an indoor facility on campus in Moscow, was not used for any Vandal football games this season. For the first time in thirty years, the Vandals did not play any games in the state of Idaho.

In the Battle of the Palouse with Washington State, the Vandals won for the first time since 1965, breaking a fourteen-game losing streak to the Cougars that lasted more than 

Tosi was selected in the fifth round of the 2000 NFL Draft and played two seasons with the Arizona Cardinals until a neck injury ended his playing career.

A few days later, former Vandal offensive lineman Tom Cable was hired

Schedule

NFL Draft
One Vandal senior was selected in the 2000 NFL Draft, which was seven rounds (254 selections).

List of Idaho Vandals in the NFL Draft

References

External links
Gem of the Mountains: 2000 University of Idaho yearbook – 1999 football season
Idaho Argonaut – student newspaper – 1999 editions

Idaho
Idaho Vandals football seasons
Idaho Vandals football